Local government in the Australian state of South Australia describes the organisations and processes by which towns and districts can manage their own affairs to the extent permitted by section 64A of Constitution Act 1934 (SA).

LGAs sorted by region

The organisations, often called local government areas (LGAs) are constituted and managed in accordance with the Local Government Act 1999 (South Australia). They are grouped below by region, as defined by the Local Government Association of South Australia. Maralinga Tjarutja and Anangu Pitjantjatjara Yankunytjatjara aboriginal councils both located in the remote north of the state are by far the largest South Australian LGAs, both exceeding 100,000 km2.  Coorong District Council and Loxton Waikerie are the next largest LGAs. 

The smallest LGAs are Walkerville and then Prospect, both occupying less than 10 km2 each.

The area with the largest population growth was Playford in Adealide's northern suburbs with a net increase of 1,363 people in the 12 months to June 2018. This was closely followed by Charles Sturt with 1,353 at the same time. Whyalla had the largest net reduction in population of 238. Port Augusta had a fall of 163. The fastest growth of an LGA in South Australia was in Maralinga Tjarutja at 4.9 percent, although off a very small base of 61. Mount Barker was the next fastest growing at 2.4% followed by the City of Adelaide at 2.3%

Metropolitan Adelaide

This group of areas are found around Metropolitan Adelaide along a 70 km stretch of the Gulf St Vincent coast and up to 50 km inland.

Regional South Australia

Eyre Peninsula

Central region

Southern and Hills region

Murray Mallee region

Southeast region

Outback

Maps

See also

District Councils Act 1887
List of cities and towns in South Australia

References

Further reading

External links
 
 Local Government Association of South Australia
 Local Government Regions of SA – clickable maps

 
Local Government Areas